MLS Game of the Week was the weekly presentation of Major League Soccer games on ESPN2.

History
Following the 2008 season, ESPN discontinued MLS Primetime Thursday, citing lagging ratings and hoping to find better lead-in programming. It was replaced by the MLS Game of the Week, which rotates among a variety of nights and time slots.

ESPN left all MLS televising duties after the 2022 MLS season, of which games will mainly be shown via streaming on MLS Season Pass.

Ratings
Ratings have largely remained steady if stagnant despite the move from the regular time slot. Viewership averaged 299,000 per broadcast in 2009, up from 253,000 in 2008; however, it dipped to 253,000 in 2010 before rebounding to 291,000 in 2011 with some matches (having been moved to ESPN as opposed to ESPN2) drawing over 600,000 viewers.

Personalities

Play-by-play announcers
 JP Dellacamera – lead play-by-play (2009–2010)
 Ian Darke – secondary play-by-play (2010–2011)
 Adrian Healey – lead play-by-play (2011–2018), alternate play-by-play (2018–2022)
 Glenn Davis – secondary play-by-play (2009–2022)
 Jon Champion – lead play-by-play (2019–2022)

Analysts
 John Harkes – lead color commentator (2009–2011)
 Kyle Martino – secondary color commentator (2009–2010)
 Taylor Twellman – secondary color commentator (2011), lead color commentator (2012–2022)
 Brian Dunseth – secondary color commentator (2013–2022)

Sideline reporter
 Allen Hopkins (2009)
 Rob Stone (2009–2011)
 Mónica González (2012–2016)
 Katie Witham (2016)
 Julie Stewart-Binks (2017)
 Sebastian Salazar (2018–2022)
 Sam Borden (2021)
 Jillian Sakovits (2022)

Studio team
 Max Bretos – lead studio host (2010–2022)
 Julie Foudy – studio analyst (2007–2022)
 Alexi Lalas – lead studio analyst (2009–2014)
 Kasey Keller – lead studio analyst (2012–2022)
 Alejandro Moreno – lead studio analyst (2012–2022)
 Adrian Healey – secondary studio host (2019–2022)
 Sebastian Salazar – lead studio host (2021–2022)
 Robin Fraser – studio analyst (2021)
 Ben Olsen – studio analyst (2022)

See also
MLS on ESPN
MLS Primetime Thursday
MLS Soccer Saturday

References

External links
ESPN MLS Homepage
MLS Homepage

2010s American television series
Game of the Week
ESPN2 original programming
2009 American television series debuts